Richard Travers (15 April 1885 – 20 April 1935) was a Canadian film actor of the silent era. He appeared in more than 140 films between 1912 and 1930.

Selected filmography

Homespun (1913) short for Essanay
The Ambition of the Baron (1915)
The Romance of an American Duchess (1915)
The White Sister (1915)
Captain Jinks of the Horse Marines (1916)
 The Phantom Buccaneer (1916)
 The Trufflers (1917)
The White Moll (1920)
The Single Track (1921)
 The Rider of the King Log (1921)
The Mountain Woman (1922)
 Dawn of Revenge (1922)
 Notoriety (1922)
The Acquittal (1923)
The Broad Road (1923)
Mary of the Movies (1923) – cameo
The Rendezvous (1923)
 The House of Youth (1924)
Head Winds (1925)
 The Truthful Sex (1926)
 The Dangerous Dude (1926)
 The Still Alarm (1926)
Lightnin' (1925)
Melting Millions (1927)
The Man Without a Face (1928)
The Black Watch (1929)
The Unholy Night (1929)
The Woman Racket (1930)

References

External links

1885 births
1935 deaths
Canadian male silent film actors
Film directors from the Northwest Territories
Male actors from the Northwest Territories
20th-century Canadian male actors
Canadian expatriate male actors in the United States